Andrés Vallejo Arcos is an Ecuadorian lawyer, journalist and politician who served as the Metropolitan Mayor of Quito. He assumed the role after the previous mayor, Paco Moncayo, resigned to run for congress. Vallejo previously served as a city councilman. Vallejo has also served in high-profile roles such as the President of the National Congress from 1986 to 1987, and the minister of the Ministerio de Gobierno from 1988 to 1990.

External links
Profile on Quito's website 

Living people
Mayors of Quito
People from Quito
Presidents of the National Congress (Ecuador)
Ecuadorian journalists
Male journalists
Government ministers of Ecuador
Members of the National Congress (Ecuador)
Democratic Left (Ecuador) politicians
Year of birth missing (living people)